Charles Gardiner (born 1 March 1983) is a former Australian rules footballer for Geelong and St Kilda in the Australian Football League.

Career
Gardiner was recruited from the Sandringham Zebras and was pick no. 23 by Geelong in the 2001 National Draft.

Gardiner was in the TAC Cup Team of the Year and Under-18 All-Australian Team in 2001. Gardiner was also runners up in Sandringham's best & fairest and Under-18 Victoria Metro representative  in 2001. In 2002 Gardiner debuted for Geelong's senior side later the same year.

Gardiner was traded to St Kilda Football Club during the 2007 trade week, along with fellow Cats player Steven King for St Kilda's draft selection 90.
He had an indifferent year, playing 12 games, including the qualifying final against old club Geelong, and kicking 9 goals but in the end it was not enough to retain his spot on the Saints' list and he was delisted at the end of the season. He has since returned to amateur football in the VAFA.

In 2019 Gardiner joined the Sydney Swans as Executive General Manager of Football.

Statistics
 Statistics are correct to end of 2008 season

References 

Player Profile: Official AFL Website of the St Kilda Football Club

1983 births
St Kilda Football Club players
Geelong Football Club players
Living people
People educated at Geelong Grammar School
Australian rules footballers from Victoria (Australia)
Sandringham Dragons players